Nicole Bullo (born 18 July 1987) is a Swiss ice hockey defenseman and member of the Swiss national team, currently playing in the Women's League (SWHL A) with HC Ladies Lugano. She represented Switzerland at the Winter Olympics in 2006, 2010 and 2014.  She is the all-time point leader amongst Team Switzerland defenders.

Career statistics

References

External links

1987 births
Living people
Ice hockey players at the 2006 Winter Olympics
Ice hockey players at the 2010 Winter Olympics
Ice hockey players at the 2014 Winter Olympics
Ice hockey players at the 2018 Winter Olympics
Ice hockey players at the 2022 Winter Olympics
People from Bellinzona
Olympic ice hockey players of Switzerland
Olympic bronze medalists for Switzerland
Olympic medalists in ice hockey
Medalists at the 2014 Winter Olympics
Swiss women's ice hockey defencemen
Sportspeople from Ticino
Swiss Women's League players